Leucania imperfecta is a species of cutworm or dart moth in the family Noctuidae. It is found in North America.

The MONA or Hodges number for Leucania imperfecta is 10452.

References

Further reading

 
 
 

Leucania
Articles created by Qbugbot
Moths described in 1894